Jim Kerr (3 October 1942 – 2008) was a Scottish professional footballer who played for Queen of the South, as a central defender.

References

1942 births
2008 deaths
Scottish footballers
Kello Rovers F.C. players
Queen of the South F.C. players
Scottish Football League players
Association football defenders